Eubostrychoceras is a genus of helically wound, corkscrew form, heteromorph ammonite which lived during the Upper Cretaceous (M Turonian - Campanian).  The genus is included in the ancycleratid family Nostoceratidae.

The shell of Eubostrychoceras is a loosely to tightly wound spiral forming a corkscrew with an open, empty umbilicus in the middle. coiling is commonly dextral (right hand). Coils are covered by moderately strong, straight transverse ribs. The aperture, or apertural end, reverses general direction and points upwards or back towards to apex. Sutures are moderately complex. The siphuncle is located mid flank.

Eubostrychoceras has a widespread distribution in the Upper Createous and has been found in Antarctica, Japan,  Spain, the far east of Russia, Alaska, Vancouver Island, U.S. western interior, Germany, and Madagascar. 
In 2001 it was reported from Alaska's Matanuska Formation as well. E. japonicum is Turonian, and likely confined to the middle Turonian.

Related genera include Anaklinoceras, Bostychocdras, Didymoceras, and Nostoceras

References
Notes

Bibliography
 The upper Cretaceous ammonite Eubosrychoceras Matsumoto in the western interior of the United States by Willian A Cobban.  U.S. Geological Survey bulletin—1690-A, Pub 1987. (Description and illustrations of an unusual ammonite from Wyoming, South Dakota, and New Mexico)
 A New Species of the Heteromorph ammonite Eubostrychoceras from the Upper Cretaceous Frontier Formation, Natrona County, Wyoming. 
We Links
  Ammonites -Nostroceratidae in French. Source of description.

External links

Ammonitida genera
Nostoceratidae
Late Cretaceous ammonites of Europe
Late Cretaceous ammonites of North America
Ammonites of Asia
Ammonites of Antarctica
Ammonites of Africa
Fossils of Spain